Ricardo Cortés (born 1973) is an illustrator and author.  He has written and illustrated a children's book about marijuana: It's Just a Plant. He illustrated Go the Fuck to Sleep, Adam Mansbach's bedtime story for adults, and I Don't Want To Blow You Up!, a coloring book with pages devoted to famous Muslims who are not terrorists.

A 2011 project is to raise money to distribute an illustrated booklet about jury nullification (under the title Jury Independence Illustrated).  The intention is to educate the public (specifically potential jurors) about their ability to acquit a defendant because the jury (or juror) disagrees with the law in question.  A grant of $2,000 has been provided by the Department of Cultural Affairs' Greater New York Arts Development.

Cortes graduated from Columbia College of Columbia University in 1995.

Selected bibliography

References

External links
Official website

1973 births
Living people
American male writers
American children's book illustrators

Columbia College (New York) alumni
Cannabis writers